Temotuloto is an islet of Nukufetau, Tuvalu to the east of Fale islet.

References

Islands of Tuvalu
Pacific islands claimed under the Guano Islands Act
Nukufetau